Sitamadji Allarassem (24 December 1988 – 4 December 2014) was a Chadian international footballer who played as a defender. He spent his entire senior career at Tourbillon FC and was also a member of the Chad national team. He earned 18 caps and was a part of the qualifying campaign for the 2010 FIFA World Cup and 2012 Africa Cup of Nations.

References

1988 births
2014 deaths
Chadian footballers
People from N'Djamena
Association football fullbacks
Chad international footballers